Bowalhasan (also Romanized as Bowalḩasan and Bū ol Ḩasan; also known as Abū ol Ḩasan, Bolḩasan, and Bolhasan) is a village in Bowalhasan Rural District, Namshir District, Baneh County, Kurdistan Province, Iran. At the 2006 census, its population was 1,195, in 195 families. The village is populated by Kurds.

References 

Towns and villages in Baneh County
Kurdish settlements in Kurdistan Province